Olbersleben is a village and a former municipality in the Sömmerda district of Thuringia, Germany. Since 1 January 2019, it is part of the municipality Buttstädt.

History
It was first mentioned as Albrechsleybyn or Albrechtisleiben in 1264.
The church called St. Wigbert was built up in 1500.

References

External links
 http://www.olbersleben.de/

Sömmerda (district)
Grand Duchy of Saxe-Weimar-Eisenach
Former municipalities in Thuringia